The Dudhwa National Park is a national park in the Terai belt of marshy grasslands in northern Uttar Pradesh, India. It is part of the Dudhwa Tiger Reserve in the Kheri and Lakhimpur districts. The park is located on the Indo-Nepali border in the Lakhimpur Kheri District, and has buffers of reserved forest areas on the northern and southern sides. It represents one of the few remaining protected areas of the diverse and productive Terai ecosystem, supporting many endangered species, obligate species of tall wet grasslands and species of restricted distribution.

History

Dudhwa became a tiger reserve in 1979. The area was established in 1958 as a wildlife sanctuary for swamp deer. Thanks to the efforts of Billy Arjan Singh the area was notified as a national park in January 1977. In 1987, the park was declared a tiger reserve and brought under the purview of the ‘Project Tiger’. Together with the Kishanpur Wildlife Sanctuary and the Katarniaghat Wildlife Sanctuary it forms the Dudhwa Tiger Reserve.

Climate
Like most of northern India, Dudhwa has an extreme humid subtropical with dry winters (CWa) type of climate. The months of February to April are ideal for visiting the park.

Prevalent winds are westerly. The hot wind Loo blows strongly from mid-April up to end of May.

Habitat
The park's mosaic of high forest interspersed with grasslands is characteristic of the Terai ecosystems in India and the area is, probably, the last prominent remnant of this type of ecosystem. The forests, especially the sal forests, have always been very dense and can be categorized into northern tropical semi-evergreen forest, northern Indian moist deciduous forest, tropical seasonal swamp forest and northern tropical dry deciduous forest. The main flora comprises sal, asna, shisham, jamun, gular, sehore and bahera. The grasslands comprise about 19% of the park. The wetlands constitute the third major habitat type and include the rivers, streams, lakes and marshes. While many of the major wetlands are perennial with some amount of surface moisture retained round the year, some dry up during hot summer.

Fauna

Major attractions of Dudhwa National Park are the tigers (population 58 in 2014) and swamp deer (population over 1,600). Billy Arjan Singh successfully hand-reared and reintroduced zoo-born tigers and leopards into the wilds of Dudhwa. Some rare species inhabit the park. Hispid hare, earlier thought to have become extinct, was rediscovered here in 1984.

In March, 1984 Indian rhinoceros was reintroduced into Dudhwa from Pobitora Wildlife Sanctuary in Assam and Nepal.

The other animals to be seen here include swamp deer, sambar deer, barking deer, spotted deer, hog deer, sloth bear, honey badger, jackal, Viverrinae, jungle cat, fishing cat and leopard cat.

Dudhwa National Park is a stronghold of the barasingha. Around half of the world's barasinghas are present in Dudhwa National Park. One can spot herd of these rare animals passing through open grasslands. Due to their slightly woolly, dark brown to pale yellow cloak, the grasslands acts as the perfect camouflage.

Birds 
Dudhwa National Park has a rich bird life with over 350 species, including a range of migratory birds that reside here during the winter. It includes among others, painted storks, black and white necked storks, sarus cranes, woodpeckers, barbets, kingfishers, minivets, bee-eaters, bulbuls and varied birds of prey.
There are also drongos, barbets, cormorants, ducks, geese, hornbills, bulbuls, teal, woodpeckers, heron, bee-eaters, minivets, kingfishers, egrets, orioles, painted storks, owls.

The marshlands are habitat for about 400 species of resident and migratory birds including the swamp francolin, great slaty woodpecker, Bengal florican, painted stork, sarus crane, several owl species, Asian barbets, woodpecker and minivets. Much of the park’s avian fauna is aquatic in nature and found around Dudhwa’s lakes such as Banke Tal.

The endangered white-rumped vulture has been sighted in a group of 115 individuals.

Gallery

References

External links

National parks in Uttar Pradesh
Lakhimpur Kheri district
Tourist attractions in Lakhimpur Kheri district
Geography of Lakhimpur Kheri district
Protected areas established in 1958
1958 establishments in Uttar Pradesh